David Mark Dror is a specialist in health insurance. He is managing director and chairman of the Micro Insurance Academy in New Delhi. Dror is a former hon. professor at Erasmus University Rotterdam.

Dror is a past recipient of a Karmaveer Puraskaar award.

Selected works

Books

References

External links 
 

Living people
Year of birth missing (living people)
Health economists
20th-century  Dutch economists
21st-century  Dutch  economists
Academic staff of Erasmus University Rotterdam